The Amazon is a 1921 German silent film directed by Richard Löwenbein and starring Eva May, Rudolf Forster, and Olga Engl.

The film's sets were designed by the art director Robert Neppach.

Cast

References

Bibliography

External links

1921 films
Films of the Weimar Republic
German silent feature films
Films directed by Richard Löwenbein
German black-and-white films
1920s German films